Jaime Serra may refer to:

Jaime Serra (artist), Catalan painter circa late Middle Ages
Jaime Serra (politician) (1921–2022), Portuguese politician
Jaime Serra I Cau, Spanish cardinal
Jaime Serra Puche (born 1955), Mexican economist and politician
Jaime Serra Palou (born 1964), Catalan artist and journalist